Cláudio Norberto Deodato (27 August 1947 – 11 September 2011) was a Brazilian footballer who played as a defender. He competed in the men's tournament at the 1968 Summer Olympics.

References

External links
 

1947 births
2011 deaths
Brazilian footballers
Association football defenders
Brazil international footballers
Olympic footballers of Brazil
Footballers at the 1968 Summer Olympics
Footballers from São Paulo
São Paulo FC players
Club Athletico Paranaense players
Esporte Clube Vitória players